Lacombe Regional Airport  is located in the northeast corner of the City of Lacombe, Alberta, Canada. It is the only airport in the surrounding Lacombe County.

References

External links
Place to Fly on COPA's Places to Fly airport directory

Lacombe, Alberta
Registered aerodromes in Alberta